News Attack is a 1989 Hong Kong action thriller drama film co-written and directed by Samson Chiu and starring Andy Lau, Michael Miu and Wilson Lam.

Plot
Rich heir Yeung Ka-chung (Wilson Lam) is a newcomer reporter. After several incidents including one saving a girl from jumping down a building, he develops great respect towards his colleagues, veteran Chui Kit (Michael Miu) and daredevil reporter Turbo (Andy Lau), admiring their sense of justice, competence, courageousness and cleverness. The two become Ka-chung's mentors and friends.

Led by Kit, the trio worked together to uncover ugly behavior of powerful tycoon Joseph Pong (Wong Kam-kong), which include forcing his mistress (Cally Kwong) to abortion which led to her suicide. Angered of the shame it caused him, Pong sends his underling to beat up Kit and led him to unemployment.

Turbo and Ka-chung both support Kit and they continue to work together to gather evidence of Pong's bribery crimes, and after many hardship, they finally hand the evidence to the police and bring Pong to justice.

Cast
Andy Lau as Turbo
Michael Miu as Chui Kit
Wilson Lam as Yeung Ka-chung
Cally Kwong as Tung Yan
Eric Tsang as Chief Editor Wong
Lo Wei as Publisher Lo
Wong Kam-kong as Joseph Pong
Blackie Ko as Joseph's thug
Chiu Hung-sin as suicide girl
Anthony Wong as Joseph's associate
James Ha as robber
Chu Tau as robber
Nick Cheung as policeman at station
Lau Siu-cheung as Reporter
Wan Kam-cheung as Reporter
Lo Kin as Inspector Cheung
Leung Yuet-ping as Chung's mom
Wu Shih as Old reporter
Wong Chi-ming as Government office guard
Lorraine Ho as Secretary
Lai Koon-lam as Reporter
Lee Wah-kon

Box office
The film grossed HK$5,744,381 at the Hong Kong box office during its theatrical run from 25 May to 7 June 1989 in Hong Kong.

See also
Andy Lau filmography

External links

News Attack at Hong Kong Cinemagic

1989 films
1989 action thriller films
1989 drama films
Hong Kong action thriller films
Hong Kong drama films
1980s chase films
1980s Cantonese-language films
Films set in Hong Kong
Films shot in Hong Kong
Films about journalists
Films directed by Samson Chiu
1989 directorial debut films
1980s Hong Kong films